Prashant Singh (born 26 October 1986) is an Indian politician. As of 2017, he is a member of Samajwadi Party. He represented the Handia Constituency in Allahabad as a member of the Uttar Pradesh Legislative Assembly Allahabad. When first elected, he was the youngest MLA in India. However, a case was filed in his name about fake age proofs.

Early life 

According to his political Advisor Ankaj Tiwari, Singh received his primary education in Dehradoon. He pursued and received an LL.M. degree from Dehradoon Law College. While he was in school, his father Mahesh Narayan, who was also an MLA of Handia, died of a chronic disease. After his father's death, Singh contested the Legislative Assembly election from Handia and won.

References

1986 births
Living people
Politicians from Allahabad
Samajwadi Party politicians
Uttar Pradesh MLAs 2012–2017
Samajwadi Party politicians from Uttar Pradesh